The 1984 Arizona State Sun Devils baseball team represented Arizona State University in the 1984 NCAA Division I baseball season. The Sun Devils played their home games at Packard Stadium, and played as part of the Pacific-10 Conference. The team was coached by Jim Brock in his thirteenth season as head coach at Arizona State.

The Sun Devils reached the College World Series, their thirteenth appearance in Omaha, where they finished in fourth place after winning games against Miami (FL) and Oklahoma State and losing to eventual runner-up Texas and champion Cal State Fullerton.

Personnel

Roster

Coaches

Schedule and results

References

Arizona State Sun Devils baseball seasons
Arizona State Sun Devils
College World Series seasons
Arizona State Sun Devils baseball